The 64th Volta a Portugal/PT Comunicações was a men's road bicycle race held from 2 August to 15 August 2002. The race, rated as a 2.2 event, started with a team time trial in Maia and finished in Sintra.

Møller (3rd) going into the final-stage time trial had to overcome a 48-second lead held by teammate Horrach to win the overall classification and, alongside Rui Sousa, complete an all  podium.

Teams 

The 16 teams invited to the race were:

Stages

Classification leadership

Final standings

General classification

Points classification

Mountains classification

Sprints classification

Team classification

External links 
 

2002 in road cycling
2002
Volta a Portugal